"Unchain My Heart" is a song written by Bobby Sharp and recorded first in 1961 by Ray Charles and in 1963 by Trini Lopez and later by many others. Sharp, a drug addict at the time, sold the song to Teddy Powell for $50. Powell demanded half the songwriting credit. Sharp later successfully fought for the rights to his song. In 1987, he was also able to renew the copyright for his publishing company, B. Sharp Music.

The song was a hit for Charles when released as a single in late 1961. Accompanied by his backup singers the Raelettes, Charles sang about wanting to be free from a woman "who won't let (him) go". His band included longtime saxophonist David "Fathead" Newman. The song reached number nine on the pop singles chart and number one on the R&B singles chart and was the working title of Charles' 2004 biopic Ray.

Charts

Ray Charles version

Joe Cocker version

Cover versions
In 1963, doo-wop band the Rivingtons covered "Unchain My Heart" on their Doin' the Bird LP. 
Trini Lopez covered it on his debut album, Trini Lopez at PJ's.
Also in 1963, Bijele Strijele, a Yugoslav rock band from Zagreb released a cover named "Mrzim taj dan" (I Hate That Day).
The track was further popularized by Joe Cocker when he named his 1987 album after the song. His version of the song was re-released in 1992 and reached number 17 in the UK. In Australia, the Howard government used Cocker's version to promote the television advertisements for the introduction of the Goods and Services Tax (GST) in 2000.
Another a cappella group, the Bobs, recorded a version in 1994.
George Williams released a version on his Shades album in 2002.
Hugh Laurie recorded a version in 2012 in the Ocean Way Studios. It appeared as a bonus track on his Didn't It Rain album.

References

External links

Bobby Sharps obituary - LA Times

1961 singles
Ray Charles songs
Joe Cocker songs
Trini Lopez songs
Nancy Wilson (jazz singer) songs
1961 songs
ABC Records singles
Paramount Records singles